12714 Alkimos  is a large Jupiter trojan from the Greek camp, approximately  in diameter. It was discovered on 15 April 1991, by American astronomer couple Carolyn and Eugene Shoemaker at the Palomar Observatory in California. The dark Jovian asteroid has a rotation period of 28.5 hours. It was named from Greek mythology after Alcimus, son of Ares and companion of Achilles.

Orbit and classification 

Alkimos is a dark Jovian asteroid in a 1:1 orbital resonance with Jupiter. It is located in the leading Greek camp at the Gas Giant's  Lagrangian point, 60° ahead of its orbit . It is also a non-family asteroid in the Jovian background population.

It orbits the Sun at a distance of 5.0–5.4 AU once every 12 years (4,370 days; semi-major axis of 5.23 AU). Its orbit has an eccentricity of 0.04 and an inclination of 10° with respect to the ecliptic. The body's observation arc begins with its first observation at the La Silla Observatory in February 1990, or 14 months prior to its official discovery observation at Palomar.

Physical characteristics 

Alkimos is an assumed C-type asteroid, while most larger Jupiter trojans are D-types.

Rotation period 

In January 2012, a rotational lightcurve of Alkimos was obtained from photometric observations by Robert Stephens at GMARS  in California. Lightcurve analysis gave a rotation period of  hours with a brightness amplitude of 0.27 magnitude.

Diameter and albedo 

According to the surveys carried out by the NEOWISE mission of NASA's Wide-field Infrared Survey Explorer, the Japanese Akari satellite and the Infrared Astronomical Satellite IRAS, Alkimos measures between 47.82 and 61.04 kilometers in diameter and its surface has an albedo between 0.036 and 0.070. The Collaborative Asteroid Lightcurve Link derives an albedo of 0.0431 and a diameter of 61.13 kilometers based on an absolute magnitude of 10.1.

Naming 

This minor planet was named from Greek mythology after the hero Alcimus, son of Ares. After Patroclus had died, he and Automedon were the two most favored by Achilles. The official naming citation was published by the Minor Planet Center on 13 October 2000.

References

External links 
 Asteroid Lightcurve Database (LCDB), query form (info )
 Dictionary of Minor Planet Names, Google books
 Discovery Circumstances: Numbered Minor Planets (10001)-(15000) – Minor Planet Center
 Asteroid 12714 Alkimos at the Small Bodies Data Ferret
 
 

012714
Discoveries by Carolyn S. Shoemaker
Discoveries by Eugene Merle Shoemaker
Named minor planets
19910415